Dargeclanis is a genus of moths in the family Sphingidae, consisting of one species, Dargeclanis grandidieri, which is known from Madagascar and the Comoros.

Species
Dargeclanis grandidieri grandidieri (Madagascar)
Dargeclanis grandidieri comorana (Rothschild & Jordan, 1916) (Comoros)

References

Smerinthini
Monotypic moth genera
Moths of Madagascar
Moths of the Comoros